Rodrigo Corrales Rodal (born 24 January 1991) is a Spanish handball player for Telekom Veszprém and the Spanish national handball team.

He participated at the 2017 World Men's Handball Championship.

Individual awards
 MVP of the SEHA League Final Four: 2020
 SEHA League All-Star Team Best Goalkeeper: 2019-20
 French Championship Best Goalkeeper: 2020

References

External links

1991 births
Living people
Spanish male handball players
Liga ASOBAL players
FC Barcelona Handbol players
Wisła Płock (handball) players
Expatriate handball players in Poland
Spanish expatriate sportspeople in France
Spanish expatriate sportspeople in Poland
People from O Morrazo
Sportspeople from the Province of Pontevedra
Handball players at the 2020 Summer Olympics
Medalists at the 2020 Summer Olympics
Olympic bronze medalists for Spain
Olympic medalists in handball
21st-century Spanish people